NRL All Stars may refer to:
 All Stars match, an annual rugby league football match between the Australian Aboriginal rugby league team and the New Zealand Maori rugby league team
 NRL All Stars team, which formerly played in the above match